The Vaziani Military Base is located  about twenty kilometers outside Tbilisi at Latitude 41.6947 Longitude 45.0467, Georgia.

Structure
The main base is spread over 10,000 hectares.
The Vaziani airfield—location: —has strategic importance as its concrete landing-strip is suitable for middle (Il-76MD) and heavy (An-124 "Ruslan") transport aircraft.

History

Soviet and Russian period
Under the Soviet Union, it was the home base of the 171st Guards District Training Centre, originating from the Soviet 1st Guards Mechanized Corps. The airfield was home to the 283rd Aviation Division of the 34th Air Army.

The Russians retained control of a number of military bases even after Georgian independence. Vaziani was one of them, the others being Gudauta, Akhalkalaki and Batumi. It was from Vaziani that Igor Giorgadze was taken on a military flight to Moscow after the 1995 assassination attempt on President Eduard Shevardnadze.

At the OSCE Summit in Istanbul in 1999, the Russian Federation and Georgia released a joint statement that Russian military bases at Gudauta and Vaziani would be disbanded and withdrawn by 1 July 2001.

Russia finally ceded control on June 29, 2001.
A battalion of Georgia's 1st Infantry Brigade, Georgian Land Forces, then took possession.

Government control
In July 2008, it was the site of Immediate Response 2008, which were U.S. training operations for Georgian forces.

It was bombed in 2008 during the Russo-Georgian War.

The Vaziani military base with its training areas has been chosen as a site for the construction of one of the planned joint NATO-Georgia training centers codenamed JTEC in accordance to the Wales Summit 2014 agreement on enhancing education and training cooperation between Georgia and NATO.

During exercise "Noble Partner 2015", a rifle company of the US 173rd Airborne Brigade Combat Team and a mechanized company of the 1st Brigade, 3rd Infantry Division deploying M2 Bradleys – 14 in total, participated in a joint mechanized infantry manoeuver alongside their Georgian counterparts, who on their side deployed the BMP-2

For "Noble Partner 2016", which took place in May 2016 on the Vaziani training area, the United States deployed an armored unit of M1 Abrams tanks.

See also
 Rustavi 2

References

External links

 The Jamestown Foundation
 OSCE Istanbul Document 1999

Military installations of Georgia (country)